stOrk was an American avant-garde metal supergroup, formed by ex-Korn touring guitarist Shane Gibson and drummer Thomas Lang in 2010. The band's debut album, stOrk, was released on January 11, 2009 via MUSO Entertainment. Their second album, Broken Pieces, was released in 2014.

On April 15, 2014, Shane Gibson died of a blood clotting disorder, at the age of 35.

Band members
 Thomas Lang - drums, keyboards (2010–2014)
 Kelly LeMieux - bass (2013–2014)

 Shane Gibson - guitars, vocals (2010–2014; his death)
 Eloy Palacios - bass (2010–2013)
 VK Lynne - Vocals (2013–2014)

Discography
 stOrk (2009)
 Broken Pieces (2014)

References

External links
 
 KORN Touring Guitarist SHANE GIBSON And Super Drummer THOMAS LANG Unleash STORK Debut, Blabbermouth.net
 Indiegogo.com

American avant-garde metal musical groups
American progressive metal musical groups
Musical groups established in 2010
2010 establishments in California